The 8-demicubic honeycomb, or demiocteractic honeycomb is a uniform space-filling tessellation (or honeycomb) in Euclidean 8-space. It is constructed as an alternation of the regular 8-cubic honeycomb.

It is composed of two different types of facets. The 8-cubes become alternated into 8-demicubes h{4,3,3,3,3,3,3}  and the alternated vertices create 8-orthoplex {3,3,3,3,3,3,4} facets .

D8 lattice 
The vertex arrangement of the 8-demicubic honeycomb is the D8 lattice. The 112 vertices of the rectified 8-orthoplex vertex figure of the 8-demicubic honeycomb reflect the kissing number 112 of this lattice. The best known is 240, from the E8 lattice and the 521 honeycomb.

 contains  as a subgroup of index 270.

The D lattice (also called D) can be constructed by the union of two D8 lattices. This packing is only a lattice for even dimensions. The kissing number is 240. (2n-1 for n<8, 240 for n=8, and 2n(n-1) for n>8). It is identical to the E8 lattice. At 8-dimensions, the 240 contacts contain both the 27=128 from lower dimension contact progression (2n-1), and 16*7=112 from higher dimensions (2n(n-1)).
 ∪  = .

The D lattice (also called D and C) can be constructed by the union of all four D8 lattices: It is also the 7-dimensional body centered cubic, the union of two 7-cube honeycombs in dual positions.
 ∪  ∪  ∪  =  ∪ .

The kissing number of the D lattice is 16 (2n for n≥5). and its Voronoi tessellation is a quadrirectified 8-cubic honeycomb, containing all trirectified 8-orthoplex Voronoi cell, .

Symmetry constructions 

There are three uniform construction symmetries of this tessellation. Each symmetry can be represented by arrangements of different colors on the 256 8-demicube facets around each vertex.

See also 
8-cubic honeycomb
Uniform polytope

Notes

References 
 Coxeter, H.S.M. Regular Polytopes, (3rd edition, 1973), Dover edition, 
 pp. 154–156: Partial truncation or alternation, represented by h prefix: h{4,4}={4,4}; h{4,3,4}={31,1,4}, h{4,3,3,4}={3,3,4,3}, ...
 Kaleidoscopes: Selected Writings of H. S. M. Coxeter, edited by F. Arthur Sherk, Peter McMullen, Anthony C. Thompson, Asia Ivic Weiss, Wiley-Interscience Publication, 1995,  
 (Paper 24) H.S.M. Coxeter, Regular and Semi-Regular Polytopes III, [Math. Zeit. 200 (1988) 3-45]
 N.W. Johnson: Geometries and Transformations, (2018)

External links 

Honeycombs (geometry)
9-polytopes